Terry Miller (born January 7, 1956) is a retired an American football running back who played in the National Football League (NFL) with the Buffalo Bills and Seattle Seahawks.

Miller was a two time All-American at Oklahoma State University in 1976 and 1977 and finished second in the 1977 Heisman Trophy voting to winner Earl Campbell.

Miller ran for 1,060 yards in his rookie season, but had only 484 total rushing yards in his second season (second to Bills' fullback Curtis Brown). By 1980, with Buffalo having found a star in rookie running back Joe Cribbs, Miller was relegated to mostly kick return duty. Terry was voted into the College Football Hall of Fame in 2022.

References

1956 births
Living people
American football running backs
Buffalo Bills players
Oklahoma State Cowboys football players
Seattle Seahawks players
All-American college football players
Players of American football from Columbus, Georgia
African-American players of American football
21st-century African-American people
20th-century African-American sportspeople